The Quetta Gladiators is a franchise cricket team that represents Quetta in the Pakistan Super League. They were one of the six teams that competed in 2018 Pakistan Super League. The team has been coached by Moin Khan and captained by Sarfaraz Ahmed.

Squad 
 Players with international caps are listed in bold.
Ages are given as of the first match of the season, 22 February 2018

Teams standings

Points table

League fixtures

Playoffs

Eliminator

References 

2018 in Balochistan, Pakistan
2018 Pakistan Super League
Gladiators in 2018
2018